József Nagy (born 21 October 1960 in Nádasd) is a Hungarian football player who participated in the 1986 World Cup in Mexico where Hungary was eliminated in the First Round.

References
 Ki kicsoda a magyar sportéletben?, II. kötet (I–R). Szekszárd, Babits Kiadó, 1995, 355. o.,  

1960 births
Living people
Hungarian footballers
Hungary international footballers
1986 FIFA World Cup players
Sportspeople from Vas County
Association football midfielders